Pruritus of genital organs may refer to:
 Pruritus scroti
 Pruritus vulvae